Tow Bay is a small bay 0.2 nautical miles (0.4 km) south of Vulcan Point on the west side of Candlemas Island, in the South Sandwich Islands. Charted and named in 1930 by DI personnel on the Discovery II.

Bays of South Georgia and the South Sandwich Islands